Míra Emberovics (born 29 July 1988 in Pécs) is a former Hungarian handballer.

Emberovics previously played for Veszprém Barabás KC, having joined the club in the summer of 2010, after agreed a mutual termination over her contract with Ferencváros in June.

Achievements
Magyar Kupa:
Silver Medalist: 2010

References

External links
Career statistics at Worldhandball

1988 births
Living people
Sportspeople from Pécs
Hungarian female handball players
Fehérvár KC players